Celso Moraes, or simply Chika (born August 4, 1979), is a Brazilian defender. He has played for Thespa Kusatsu.

Celso previously played for Ji-Paraná in the Copa do Brasil.

Club statistics

References

External links

1979 births
Living people
Brazilian footballers
Brazilian expatriate footballers
J2 League players
Japan Football League players
Thespakusatsu Gunma players
Expatriate footballers in Japan
Association football defenders